International rankings of South Sudan

Culture

Demographics

Population  ranked 94

Economy

Education

Environment

Globalization

Geography

Total area ranked 45

Military

Politics

Religion

Transportation

References

South Sudan